Louis Buvelot ( Morges 3 March 1814 – Melbourne 30 May 1888), born Abram-Louis Buvelot, was a Swiss landscape painter who lived 17 years in Brazil and following 5 years back in Switzerland stayed 23 years in Australia, where he influenced the Heidelberg School of painters.

Early life
Buvelot was born in Morges, Vaud, Switzerland, second son of François Simeon Buvelot, postal official, and his wife Jeanne-Louise née Heizer, a school teacher. Louis Buvelot (who disliked his first name and never used it) worked under Marc-Louis Arland at Lausanne, and from around 1834 continued his studies at Paris with Camille Flers, a well-known landscape painter of the day. After a few months there he migrated to Bahia, Brazil where he worked on his uncle's coffee plantation. In October 1840 Buvelot moved to Rio de Janeiro and attracted the notice of the emperor Dom Pedro II, who bought some of his pictures and decorated him with the Order of the Rose. In November 1843 Buvelot married Marie-Félicité, née Lalouette (born 1816). Buvelot returned to Switzerland in 1852 and in 1856 was awarded a silver medal for a picture exhibited at Bern. Buvelot having lived in a warm country and finding the cold of Switzerland trying to his health left his family in La Chaux-de-Fonds and sailed from Liverpool bound for Melbourne, Australia in 1864 accompanied by Caroline-Julie Beguin, a teacher.

Career in Australia
Arriving in Melbourne in February 1865, Buvelot was in business as a photographer in Bourke Street for a year but soon resumed his painting. He lived for some years in Latrobe Street East, and then moved to George Street, Fitzroy. His new wife, Caroline-Julie Beguin, helped by teaching French, and presently he began to find buyers for his pictures, of whom James Smith was one of the earliest. In 1869 the trustees of the National Gallery of Victoria bought two of his pictures, and in 1870 paid £131 for the Waterpool at Coleraine. In 1873, 1880 and 1884 he was awarded gold medals at exhibitions held in Melbourne, and he also received a silver medal at the Philadelphia exhibition of 1876. His reputation became established, his only interest was his work, and he went on steadily painting until his death on 30 May 1888. He was buried at the Boroondara Cemetery, where a large monument was erected in his memory.

Legacy

Buvelot's widow, also an artist, died in 1902, there were no children. In July 1888 a memorial exhibition of his work was held at the National Gallery of Victoria, Melbourne, and one of the galleries in that building was subsequently named after him.

Buvelot is best known for his great contribution to Australian art. His works, mostly oil landscapes, are quite well regarded, but perhaps his impact was even greater as a tutor of several members of the Heidelberg School, including Arthur Streeton, who named Buvelot's 1866 painting Summer Evening Near Templestowe the "first fine landscape painted in Victoria".

His enthusiasm for plein air painting (that is, painting directly in the open air) was a key characteristic of those artists' work.

Collections
 National Gallery of Victoria, NGV also holds and his bust by Bertram Mackennal and a portrait in oils by J. C. Waite
 Art Gallery of New South Wales
 Art Gallery of Western Australia 
 Art Gallery of Ballarat
 Geelong Gallery 
 Castlemaine Art Museum
 Tate Gallery in London

See also
 French Australians
Australian art

References

External links
Buvelot, Abram-Louis (1814–1888) – Australian Dictionary of Biography

1814 births
1888 deaths
Australian landscape painters
Australian people of French descent
Australian people of Swiss descent
Swiss landscape painters
19th-century Australian painters
19th-century Australian male artists
People from Morges
Australian male painters